Klingenthal is a town in the Vogtland region, in Saxony, south-eastern Germany. It is situated directly on the border with the Czech Republic opposite the Czech town of Kraslice, 29 km southeast of Plauen, and 33 km northwest of Karlovy Vary.

The Aschberg ("cinder mountain") towers above the town at 936 m. The extremely elongated town, 10.5 km from end to end, is surrounded by numerous woods of firs.

The town is bisected by the Döbra and Zwota rivers. These two rivers unite at the Czech-German border to form the Svatava river, which in turn flows into the Ohře river at Sokolov.

History 

In 1591, Sebastian Köppel established a hammer mill near the border to Bohemia on the banks of the Zwota in order to capitalize on the rich deposits of iron ore and the region's vast supplies of wood, both for building and charcoal production. On 1 February 1602, there was the first documented mention of the "Höllhammer" (in English approximately: "Hell Hammer" or "Hollow Hammer") in the neighboring town of Schöneck's church register. At that time, blacksmiths, miners and charcoal makers were living there. In 1628, the hammer mill burned down and was only partly rebuilt.

In mid-17th century, Bohemian emigrants fleeing the Counter-Reformation brought the luthier's craft to Klingenthal, which – after the Peace of Westphalia – was a safe haven for Protestants.

In 1716, the foundation of a luthiers' guild was celebrated. Towards the end of the 18th century, bow makers' and string makers' crafts came to Klingenthal, but also the production of wood and brass wind instruments. In 1829, mouthharp production followed and in 1852, accordion production began. In the second half of the 19th century, the production of mouthharps, accordions and other more complex instruments had mostly displaced older branches of musical instrument production.

In 1875, Klingenthal was connected to railway services.

On 1 October 1919, Klingenthal received its town charter; on 1 July 1950 Sachsenberg-Georgenthal were incorporated into the town.

On 25 July 1952, parts of the former districts of Auerbach and Oelsnitz were cut off to form the district of Klingenthal. From 1949 to 1990, Klingenthal was home to the Klingenthaler Harmonikawerke, a state-owned company that was the main producer of accordions, harmonicas, and electronic instruments in East Germany.

On 1 April 1992, Mühlleithen, a settlement on the north-western crest of the Aschberg, was incorporated.

Since 1996, Klingenthal is part of the newly formed Vogtlandkreis. In contrast to Klingenthal, Bas-Rhin, this towns name was Klingenthal/Sa. (Sa. standing for Saxony). By decision of the town government, the Sa. appendix was annulled in January 2007. Ever since, the town's name is just Klingenthal.

Economy 

While traditionally, the town has been a manufacturing center of musical instruments, it is also a ski resort. One of the main branches of Klingenthal's today's economy is tourism. It is home to the Baroque Zum Friedefürsten round church.

In 2005 Vogtlandarena was ready for use and there are now competitions in the Nordic Combined World Cup and Ski Jumping World Cup. It has already been a national centre for ski jumping during GDR time.

Notable citizens 
 Max Hess (1878–1975), musician, (solo-)bugler and Schlaraffian
 Rolf Thomas Lorenz (born 1959), composer
 Karl Möckel (1901–1948), Nazi SS officer at Auschwitz concentration camp executed for war crimes
 Karlheinz Steinmüller, physicist and science fiction author
 Ernst Uebel (1882–1959), composer and musician

References

External links 
 Official web page of the town of Klingenthal
 Klingenthal winter resort
 Music and winter sports museum

 
Vogtlandkreis